Tobias Schellenberg (born November 17, 1978, in Leipzig) is a German  competitive and synchronized diver.

In 2000 he became three-time German Champion in competitive diving, and European Champion in synchronized diving on the 3 m springboard together with his partner Andreas Wels.

In competitive diving, he won another two German Champion titles in 2001, four in 2002, and five in 2003. Together with Andreas Wels he became vice European Champion in synchronized diving on the 3 m springboard in 2002, and won bronze at the 2003 World Aquatics Championships in Barcelona.

At the 2004 Olympic Games in Athens Tobias Schellenberg and Andreas Wels won the silver medal in synchronized diving on the 3 m springboard. They also won the silver medal in synchronized diving on the 3 m springboard at the 2005 World Aquatics Championships in Montreal.

External links 
 
 

1978 births
Living people
German male divers
Olympic divers of Germany
Divers at the 2004 Summer Olympics
Olympic silver medalists for Germany
Olympic medalists in diving
Medalists at the 2004 Summer Olympics
World Aquatics Championships medalists in diving
Universiade medalists in diving
Universiade bronze medalists for Germany
Medalists at the 2001 Summer Universiade
Medalists at the 2003 Summer Universiade
Divers from Leipzig
21st-century German people